Fifty/Fifty is a 1992 American action adventure comedy film. It stars Peter Weller and Robert Hays as two operatives who form a begrudging alliance to overthrow a Southeast Asian dictator on behalf of the CIA, and find friendship, love and a political conscience along the way. The film is directed by Charles Martin Smith, who also has a supporting role as their sympathetic and morally conflicted handler.

Plot
When the CIA needs to help rebels remove maniacal tyrant General Bosavi from his Southeast Asian island country, there are just two men around for the job: American mercenaries and bickering former colleagues Jake Wyer and Sam French, who don't have much of an allegiance to either side of the conflict, and are more interested in fattening their pockets.
Under duress, both men are reunited and tasked with raising an army. But the candidates are few and the odds are high—until a beautiful freedom fighter shows them the way. The two men will have to overcome their rivalry and venal temperament to become something they never thought they would: heroes.

Cast
 Peter Weller as Jake Wyer
 Robert Hays as Sam French
 Charles Martin Smith as Martin Sprue
 Ramona Rahman as Suleta
 Lim Kay Tong as Akhantar
 Dom Magwili as General Bosavi
 Azmil Mustapha as Colonel Kota 
 Dharma Harun Al-Rashid as Sentul
 Mr. Os as Jamik
 Rohmat Juraimi as Muscular Rebel
 Hussein Abu Hassan as Bus Driver
 Shaharuddin Thamby as Colonel Seng

Production
The writing team of Dennis Shryack and Michael Butler was best known for two Clint Eastwood vehicles, The Gauntlet and Pale Rider. When their script for a Dirty Harry sequel was not picked up by the actor, it was retooled as the Chuck Norris starrer Code of Silence for producer Raymond Wagner and Orion Pictures. Wagner and Shryack later moved to Cannon for another Norris film, an adaptation of the serial killer novel Hero and the Terror. Shryack also brought with him an earlier script written with Butler, Fifty/Fifty.

Sylvester Stallone had previously been in talks to co-star in Fifty/Fifty for Paramount Pictures, first with Eddie Murphy around 1983, and later with Kurt Russell. The pair eventually chose to make Tango and Cash instead. Cannon picked up the script and went into pre-production with Chuck Norris in the Stallone role. The project was announced in the press in April 1990. Norris, however, balked at the idea of doing another jungle shoot, as his two previous works in this terrain, Missing in Action III and Delta Force 2, had been tarnished by deadly helicopter crashes. He was replaced by Peter Weller. The film was primarily filmed in Malaysia, while the epilogue was shot in Rome, Italy. Some sources mention Sri Lanka as an additional location. Principal photography took place from October 22 to December 19, 1990.

Fifty/Fifty made appearances at both spring and fall sessions of the 1991 American Film Market. However its release was severely compromised by turmoil at Cannon. During production in late 1990, it was reported that the film would be distributed by MGM-Pathé. Around that time, MGM, Pathé and Cannon were all part of Giancarlo Paretti's controversial media empire. In 1991, Cannon began operating as a separate entity again under former head of production Christopher Pearce, who became the majority shareholder. Burdened by years of mismanagement, the company shelved films and released them at a trickle depending on their day-to-day fortunes. In January 1993, Cannon announced that it had finally secured funds to distribute a new slate of five pictures, headlined by Fifty/Fifty and Midnight Ride.

Release
In the United States, Fifty/Fifty received a limited theatrical release from Cannon on February 26, 1993. The film was released on VHS on May 19, 1993. It peaked at 37 in the Billboard video rental charts. A LaserDisc version followed on June 16. Both were handled by Warner Home Video, which had already released the film in several international markets throughout 1992.

Warner Home Video also released the film on DVD domestically on December 6, 2005.

Reception
Fifty/Fifty garnered mixed reviews. Marjorie Baumgarten of The Austin Chronicle was particularly scathing in her assessment, finding its attempt to mix buddy movie humor with the realistic ordeal of a struggle against dictatorship to be "about as uncomfortable a fence straddler you're ever likely to see". She gave the film half a star out of five. Varietys Lawrence Cohn found the film "mediocre" and an obvious modern variant on Butch Cassidy and the Sundance Kid, but conceded that the stunts and technical values were "adequate". 

Kevin Thomas of the Los Angeles Times, traditionally a supporter of action films, deemed the premise "inherently familiar and predictable", but said that it "boasted more wit and intelligence than is usual with such fare". He called Weller and Hays' chemistry "contagious". The Washington Post'''s Hal Hinson also noted the Butch Cassidy parallels, yet he was more amenable to the film, decreeing it "a not bad grade-B genre picture that's about one major star away from being a not bad grade-A genre picture". He enjoyed Weller's performance, but was more reserved about Hays. Although it is unknown if his remark was coincidental, he said that "Kurt Russell would have been ideal" for his role. 

SoundtrackFifty/Fiftys score was composed by Peter Bernstein. It was performed by a 65-piece orchestra, also conducted by Bernstein. A selection of the film's cues was released on limited edition CD and digital download by Dragon's Domain Records on November 7, 2022, as part of the album The Peter Bernstein Collection Volume 3''.

References

External links

 
 
 

1992 films
Films directed by Charles Martin Smith
1990s action adventure films
American action adventure films
Films about coups d'état
Films about mercenaries
Golan-Globus films
1990s English-language films
1990s American films